Lei Tung II is one of the 17 constituencies in the Southern District, Hong Kong.

The constituency returns one district councillor to the Southern District Council, with an election every four years. The seat was last held by Lo Kin-hei of the Democratic Party.

Lei Tung II constituency is loosely based on the western part of the Lei Tung Estate in Ap Lei Chau with estimated population of 12,548.

Councillors represented

Election results

2010s

2000s

1990s

Notes

Citations

References
2011 District Council Election Results (Southern)
2007 District Council Election Results (Southern)
2003 District Council Election Results (Southern)
1999 District Council Election Results (Southern)
 

Constituencies of Hong Kong
Constituencies of Southern District Council
1994 establishments in Hong Kong
Constituencies established in 1994
Ap Lei Chau